Dichomeris leucostena is a moth in the family Gelechiidae. It was described by Walsingham in 1911. It is found in Mexico (Guerrero).

The forewings are brownish fuscous, darker on the basal third than beyond it, with a broad darkened oblique shade parallel with the termen at three-fourths, and a small dark spot about the upper angle of the cell. There is a broad white band along the costa,  including at its origin the whole base of the wing, except for a short dark streak along the extreme costa, and gradually attenuate to its apex at the commencement of the costal cilia. The hindwings are pale greyish.

References

Moths described in 1911
leucostena